The Battle of Marathon is a rhymed, dramatic, narrative poem by Elizabeth Barrett (later Browning). Written in 1820, when Barrett was aged 14, it retells powerfully The Battle of Marathon, during which the Athenian state defeated the much larger invading force during the first Persian invasion of Greece.

When Darius the Great orders his immense army to march west to annex additional territories, no-one in the Persian court predicted that some fractious, independent Greek city-states stood any chance against the Persian super-power. And yet at Marathon in 490 BC, Darius' plans received a decisive check in the brilliant Athenian offensive overseen by the aged but hardy Miltiades, who overran the Persian army just landed upon their coasts, cutting their opponents down to the last man.

Some of the Greeks' enemies are more than mortal; Aphrodite herself swears vengeance for the actions of their forebears in destroying her beloved Troy generations earlier.

The poem is written in heroic couplet that is in iambic pentameter rhymed AABBCCDD...

References

External links
 The Battle of Marathon, full text at the Internet Archive
 

1820 poems
Poetry by Elizabeth Barrett Browning
Narrative poems